Marcel Kučera (born 17 June 1971) is a Czech former professional ice hockey goaltender.

Kučera played four games in the Czechoslovak First Ice Hockey League for HC Kladno and 33 games in the Czech Extraliga for HC Karlovy Vary. He also played in the Codan Ligaen for the Odense Bulldogs and the Eliteserien for Lillehammer IK.

References

External links

1971 births
Living people
HC Baník Sokolov players
Czech ice hockey goaltenders
Sportovní Klub Kadaň players
HC Karlovy Vary players
Lillehammer IK players
Odense Bulldogs players
Rytíři Kladno players
HC Slovan Ústečtí Lvi players
Czech expatriate ice hockey people
Czech expatriate sportspeople in Denmark
Czech expatriate sportspeople in Norway
Expatriate ice hockey players in Denmark
Expatriate ice hockey players in Norway